John Cunliffe (born 8 August 1984) is an English former professional footballer.

Career

College and amateur
Born in Bolton, Cunliffe was a schoolboy trainee with both Manchester United and Blackburn Rovers, before moving to the United States to play college soccer in 2002. He was a pupil at Turton Media Arts College in Bromley Cross, Bolton before turning professional and moving to America to pursue a career in football.

After posting remarkable scoring totals at NCAA Division II Fort Lewis College in Durango, Colorado, and in the USL Premier Development League, for Boulder Rapids Reserve, Cunliffe was one of the leading prospects at the MLS combine prior to the 2007 MLS SuperDraft.

Cunliffe also had a brief spell at English Northern Premier League First Division North outfit Rossendale United in 2005–06.

Professional
Cunliffe was drafted in the first round (7th overall) of the 2007 MLS SuperDraft by Chivas USA. He made his MLS debut on 7 April against Toronto FC and assisted on the clinching goal in a 2–0 win. He scored his first MLS goal against the Kansas City Wizards on 29 July 2007.

He was acquired by San Jose for Chris Pozniak on 28 March 2008, the day before the beginning of the 2008 season. He scored his first goal with the Earthquakes on 31 May 2008 in a 3–1 to loss to Real Salt Lake, a rocket shot from within the penalty area. He nearly scored a second goal later in the match with a shot that went slightly wide. On 2 March 2009, just prior to the start of the 2009 season, Cunliffe was placed on waivers by the Earthquakes.

He joined Carolina RailHawks for the 2009 season.

In December 2010, Cunliffe returned to England signing for Chorley. In April 2013 Cunliffe announced his retirement from the game due to a long-standing ankle problem.

References

External links
Carolina RailHawks bio
MLS player profile

1984 births
Living people
Blackburn Rovers F.C. players
Colorado Rapids U-23 players
North Carolina FC players
Chivas USA players
English footballers
English expatriate footballers
Fort Lewis Skyhawks men's soccer players
Manchester United F.C. players
San Jose Earthquakes players
Chorley F.C. players
Expatriate soccer players in the United States
USL First Division players
USL League Two players
Major League Soccer players
Rossendale United F.C. players
Chivas USA draft picks
Association football forwards
English expatriate sportspeople in the United States